The following is a timeline of the history of the city of Durban in the eThekwini Metropolitan Municipality, KwaZulu-Natal province, South Africa.

19th century

 1824 - British settlement of Port Natal established on land "acquired...through treaties with the Zulu king Shaka."
 1835 - Settlement renamed "D'Urban" after British colonial administrator Benjamin D'Urban.
 1839
 A small British military force was stationed at the port.
 On its withdrawal Dutch emigrants from the Cape took possession and proclaimed the Natalia Republic.
 1841 - Printing press in operation (approximate date).
 1842 
 A British military force reoccupied Durban.
 Treaty signed by the Dutch recognizing British sovereignty.
 1846 - "Native reserves" created.
 1851 - Natal Times newspaper begins publication.
 1852 - Mercury newspaper begins publication.
 1854
 "First Town Council, consisting of 8 members representing four wards" created.
 George Cato becomes mayor.
 Natal Bank in business.
 D'Urban Club formed.
 1860
 26 June: Natal Railway (Market Square-Customs Point) begins operating in Durban.
 Indian workers begin to arrive in Durban.
 1863 - Population: approximately 5,000 (3,390 white, 1,380 black and 230 Asian).
 1865 - Sites for Albert Park and Victoria Park established.
 1866 - Durban High School was founded. 
 1870 - Durban Fire Department founded.
 1880 - Magazine Barracks built.
 1882 - Durban High School for Girls was founded. 
 1885 - Town Hall built.
 1887 - Durban Girls' College was founded. 
 1888 - Lord's cricket ground established.
 1889 - Natal cricket team formed.
 1896 - Population: 31,877.
 1899 - Maris Stella School was founded.

20th century

1900s-1950s
 1902 - Electric tram begins operating.
 1903
 Utrecht and Vryheid become part of city.
 Indian Opinion newspaper begins publication.
 1904
 Zulu Ilanga lase Natal newspaper begins publication.
 Indian leader Mahatma Gandhi establishes settlement at Phoenix.
 Population: 67,842.
 1908 - Union Whaling Station begins operating.
 1910 
 Durban becomes part of newly formed Union of South Africa.
 Glenwood High School was founded. 
 1911 - Population: 69,187 (31,783 white, 17,784 black, 19,620 Asian).
 1914 -  newspaper begins publication.
 1921
 Clairwood Shree Siva Soobramoniar Temple built.
 Comrades Marathon (Pietermaritzburg-Durban) begins.
 1923 - Kingsmead Cricket Ground in use.
 1924 - Clifton School was founded. 
 1926 - Memorial Cenotaph unveiled in Farewell Square.
 1929 - St. Henry's Marist College was founded. 
 1931 - Natal University College Durban campus established.
 1935 - Durban officially gained its city status. 
 1946 - Population: 338,817 city.
 1949
 Anti-Indian riot.
 Electric tram stops operating.
 1950 - Parliamentary Group Areas Act leads to urban apartheid.
 1951 - November: World premiere of feature film Cry, the Beloved Country.
 1953 - Northlands High School for Girls was founded. 
 1958 - Kings Park Stadium opens.

1960s-1990s
 1960
 Ukhozi FM radio begins broadcasting.
 African Art Centre established.
 Population: 560,010 city; 681,492 metro.
 1961
 University College for Indians established on Salisbury Island.
 Durban becomes part of the new Republic of South Africa.
 1965 - Cinerama Theatre opens.
 1966 - Brettonwood High School was founded. 
 1968 - Durban Heights water reservoir begins operating.
 1970 - Population: 736,853 city; 850,946 metro.
 1972 - University of Durban-Westville opens.
 1973 - 1973 Durban strikes
 1977 - Durban Container Terminal begins operating at the Port of Durban.
 1978 - 8 January: Academic Rick Turner assassinated.
 1985
 Anti-Indian unrest.
 23 December: Amanzimtoti bombing occurs near Durban.
 Population: 634,301 city; 982,075 metro.
 1986 - 14 June: Durban beach-front bombing occurs.
 1990 
 "Separate Amenities Act was repealed, thus opening up Durban’s facilities to all races."
 Northwood School was founded. 
 1991 - Population: 715,669 city; 1,137,378 metro.
 1993
 June: 1993 African Championships in Athletics held in Durban.
 Pavilion shopping centre in business in Westville.
 1995 - Sharks (rugby union) formed.
 1996
 Part of 1996 Africa Cup of Nations football contest played in Durban.
 Obed Mlaba becomes mayor.
 City website Durban.gov.za launched (approximate date).
 Population: 669,242.
 1997 - International Convention Centre opens.
 1998 - September: International summit of the Non-Aligned Movement held in city.
 1999 - November: Commonwealth Heads of Government Meeting 1999 held in city.
 2000
 July: XIII International AIDS Conference, 2000 held in city.
 5 December: South African municipal elections, 2000 held.
 Durban becomes seat of newly created eThekwini Metropolitan Municipality.

21st century
 2001
 UN World Conference against Racism 2001 held in city. 
 Population: 536,644 city.
 Gateway shopping centre in business in nearby Umhlanga.
 2002
 6 February: 2002 Charlotte's Dale train collision occurs in vicinity of Durban.
 9 July: African Union launched in Durban.
 2003
 Dolphins cricket team formed.
 Part of 2003 Cricket World Cup played in Durban.
 2004
 University of KwaZulu-Natal established.
 uShaka Marine World theme park in business.
 2005 - 19 March: Demonstration at Kennedy Road shack settlement.
 2006
 February: Strike at the University of KwaZulu-Natal.
 1 March: South African municipal elections, 2006 held.
 2007 - Eden College was founded. 
 2008 - Ulwazi Programme for local history launched.
 2009
 24 September: Airplane crash occurs.
 26 September: Ethnic attack on Kennedy Road shack settlement.
 Moses Mabhida Stadium opens in Stamford Hill.
 2010
 King Shaka International Airport opens.
 Part of 2010 FIFA World Cup football contest played in Durban.
 Field Band Academy founded.
 2011
 18 May: South African municipal elections, 2011 held.
 November–December: 2011 United Nations Climate Change Conference held in city.
 James Nxumalo becomes mayor.
 Population: 595,061 city; 3,442,361 metro.
 2013
 March: International 5th BRICS summit held in city.
 Part of 2013 Africa Cup of Nations football contest played in Durban.
 2016
 3 August: South African municipal elections, 2016 held.
 2016 African Championships in Athletics held in city.
 Zandile Gumede becomes mayor.
 2017 - March: Durban bid for the 2022 Commonwealth Games rejected.

See also
 Durban history (fr)
 List of mayors of Durban
 Timelines of other cities in South Africa: Cape Town, Johannesburg, Pietermaritzburg, Port Elizabeth, Pretoria

References

Bibliography

published in 19th-20th centuries

published in 21st century

External links

  (Articles, images etc.)
 
  (Directory of South African archival and memory institutions and organisations)
  (Bibliography)
  (Bibliography)
  (Bibliography)
  (Images, etc.)
  (Images, etc.)
  (Bibliography of open access  articles)

 
Durban
durban
Durban-related lists